Carey or Cary Dillon, 5th Earl of Roscommon, PC (Ire) (1627–1689) was an Irish nobleman and professional soldier of the seventeenth century. He held several court offices under King Charles II and his successor King James II. After the Glorious Revolution he joined the Williamite opposition to James and was in consequence attainted as a traitor by James II's Irish Parliament in 1689. In that year he fought at the Siege of Carrickfergus shortly before his death in November of that year.

In his younger days, he was a friend of Samuel Pepys, who in his Diary followed with interest Dillon's abortive courtship of their mutual friend, the noted beauty Frances Butler. The couple did not marry; Carey later married Katherine Werden.

Birth and origins 
Carey was born in 1627, a younger son of Robert Dillon by his third wife Anne Strode. At the time of his birth, his father was the heir apparent of James Dillon, 1st Earl of Roscommon and held the courtesy title of Baron Dillon of Kilkenny-West. His father would succeed as 2nd Earl in 1641. Some time before that date his father had conformed to the established religion. His father's family owned substantial lands in Meath, Westmeath, Longford and Roscommon. The Dillons were Old English and descended from Sir Henry Dillon who came to Ireland with Prince John in 1185.

Carey's mother was English and a Protestant, a daughter of Sir William Strode in England and widow of Henry Folliott, 1st Baron Folliott in Ireland.

Carey seems to have been the only child of his father's third marriage, but he had half-siblings from his father's earlier marriages and his mother's earlier marriage. His father's first marriage had been with Margaret Barry, daughter of David FitzDavid de Barry, grand-daughter of David de Barry, 5th Viscount Buttevant and sister of David Barry, 1st Earl of Barrymore. His father's second marriage had been with Dorothy Hastings, fourth daughter of George Hastings, 4th Earl of Huntingdon and widow of Sir James Steuart. These four half-siblings are listed in his father's article.

His mother's first marriage had been with Henry Folliott, 1st Baron Folliott. Carey's half-siblings from that side are listed in the article about his mother's first husband.

Carey Dillon was a Protestant. His half-brother James, the 3rd Earl, was converted to the established religion by Archbishop Ussher.

Early life

Thomas Wentworth, Earl of Strafford 
In 1630; while Carey was a boy, his grandfather, his father and his eldest half-brother were staunch supporters of Thomas Wentworth, later Earl of Strafford, who was appointed Lord Deputy of Ireland in 1632. About 1635 Carey's half-brother James, later the 3rd Earl, married Strafford's sister Elizabeth. Their eldest son, the future 4th Earl of Roscommon, was named "Wentworth". Strafford, however, also had powerful enemies and was impeached by the English Parliament in November 1640 and after this failed, a bill of attainder was brought against him, which was passed in May 1641 and signed by the king on 10 May. Strafford was executed on 12 May 1641 on Tower Hill.

Carey's grandfather James died in March 1641 and was succeeded by his eldest son, Robert, Carey's father, as the 2nd Earl of Roscommon.

Irish War 
The Irish Rebellion of 1641 broke out on 23 October 1641. The 2nd Earl of Roscommon died on 27 August 1642 in Dublin. and was succeeded by his eldest son James Dillon, 3rd Earl of Roscommon, Carey's halfbrother.

During the English Civil War, both Dillon brothers were staunch Royalists: James, who died in 1649, was posthumously listed in Cromwell's Act for the Settlement of Ireland 1652 as one of the leaders of the Royalist cause in Ireland who were excluded from pardon, and thus liable to forfeiture of their estates.

As a younger son with his livelihood to earn, in the war-torn Ireland of the 1640s and 1650s, a military career was an obvious choice for him: he was made a captain by the age of seventeen.

Pepys's Diary 
Samuel Pepys first mentions "Colonel Dillon" in his famous Great Diary in 1660. He evidently liked him, calling him "a very merry and witty companion". In the early 1660s one of Pepys's closest friends was a young clergyman called Daniel Butler (nicknamed "Monsieur l'Impertinent", apparently because he never stopped talking). He was probably, like Dillon, an Irishman. Shortly afterwards he went to Ireland, apparently at Dillon's urging. Pepys admired both of Butler's sisters, especially Frances (nicknamed "la belle Boteler"), whom he thought was one of the greatest beauties in London. Dillon courted Frances, and matters proceeded as far as an engagement, but this was broken off in 1662, apparently after a violent quarrel between Dillon and Frances's brother "Monsieur l'Impertinent", who complained of Dillon's "knavery" to him. In the summer of 1668 Dillon apparently renewed his proposal of marriage – Pepys saw him and Frances riding in a carriage together – but it seems that Frances declined his offer. It is not known whether Frances ever married.

Although Samuel Pepys always called him "Colonel Dillon" in his diary, he was apparently only a lieutenant until 1684, when he became a major, and subsequently a colonel.

Howard Duel 
Following the Restoration of Charles II, Dillon entered politics, sitting in the Irish House of Commons as MP for Banagher in the Parliament of 1661–1666.

His career was almost ruined in 1662 when he acted as second to Colonel Thomas Howard (a younger brother of Charles Howard, 1st Earl of Carlisle) in his notorious duel with Henry Jermyn, 1st Baron Dover (Howard and Dover being rivals for the affections of the notoriously promiscuous Anna Talbot, Countess of Shrewsbury). Howard left Lord Dover for dead, and Dillon killed Dover's second, Giles Rawlings, a Gentleman of the Privy Purse to the Duke of York. Dillon and Howard fled from London, but later returned to stand trial. As was usual in affairs of honour, they were both acquitted, as killing a man in a duel, although counted as murder in a court of law, was then generally regarded as being expected of a man who wished to preserve his honour.

Political career 
This check to his career was temporary, and after 1670 his rise in Irish public life was rapid. He was sworn a member of the Privy Council of Ireland in 1673, and also became Master of the Irish Mint, Commissary-General of the Horse of Ireland, Surveyor-General for Customs and Excise in Ireland, and a Governor of the Royal Hospital Kilmainham. 

In 1685, on the death of his nephew, the poet Wentworth Dillon, 4th Earl of Roscommon, he succeeded as the 5th Earl of Roscommon.

Kilkenny affair 
The following year Lord Roscommon, as he was now, clashed bitterly with Richard Talbot, 1st Earl of Tyrconnell, the rising Roman Catholic Royal favourite. Tyrconnell, as Lieutenant-General of the Irish Army, had removed all the Protestant officers of the regiment stationed at Kilkenny. Roscommon, with it seems considerable justification, challenged his legal right to do so, and when the matter came before the Lord Lieutenant of Ireland, Lord Clarendon, Roscommon called Tyrconnell a liar to his face: this was a shrewd blow since Tyrconnell had the unfortunate nickname "Lying Dick Talbot". The "Kilkenny affair" caused something of a furore in Ireland, but did not damage Tyrconnell's standing at the English Court.

Marriage and children 
He married Katherine Werden (died 1683), daughter of John Werden (died 1646) of Chester and Katherine Dutton, daughter of Edward Dutton, and sister of Lieutenant-General Robert Werden.

 
Carey and Katherine had a son:
Robert (died 1715), who succeeded him as the 6th Earl of Roscommon, and is said still to have been a young child when his father died

—and two daughters:
Anne, who married Sir Thomas Nugent in about 1675
Catherine (died 1674), who married Hugh Montgomery, 2nd Earl of Mount Alexander

The sisters were so many years older than their brother that it is possible they were children of an earlier marriage. If so, their mother must have died before 1660, since it is clear from the Diary of Samuel Pepys that Dillon was free to marry between 1660 and 1668.

Williamite 

Having served the Stuart dynasty with notable loyalty both during the Civil War and after the Restoration, Lord Roscommon, like many of the Irish Protestant ruling class, changed sides after the downfall and flight to France of James II in 1688. Roscommon and the majority of his fellow peers were opposed to James's pro-Catholic policy, and were appalled at the mishandling of the economy by Tyrconnel, the Lord Deputy of Ireland, with whom Roscommon had a bitter personal feud as well. When James, in 1689, attempted to reconquer England by occupying Ireland, Roscommon offered his services to King William III of England. He was commissioned to raise a regiment on William's behalf. He was attainted for treason by the Patriot Parliament, held in Dublin from 7 May to 20 July 1689. He was present at the Siege of Carrickfergus, which was defended by Charles MacCarthy More. The surrender of the town and castle on 28 August 1689, was the crucial first step in William's campaign to wrest control of Ireland from James II during the Williamite War in Ireland.

Death and timeline 
He left Ireland and died on 25 November 1689 in Chester.

Notes and references

Notes

Citations

Sources 

 
  – 1660 to 1690
 
  – Ibbetson to Zouche (for Roscommon)
  – (for Dillon of Roscommon)
  – (for Charles I)
  – N to R (for Roscommon)
  – (for the duel)
  – (for timeline)
 
  – (for MP)
 
  (for his father's 1st wife, Margaret Barry)
 
  – 1 April 1661 to 31 December 1662 (for the duel)
  – 1 May 1668 to 31 May 1669 (for Frances Butler)
  – 1643 to 1685
  – 1641 to 1643
 
 
 

1627 births
1689 deaths
Earls of Roscommon
Dillon, Carey
Dillon, Carey
Members of the Privy Council of Ireland
Williamite military personnel of the Williamite War in Ireland